Hallsten is a surname. Notable people with the surname include:

Ilmi Hallsten (1862–1936), Finnish teacher and politician, wife of Onni
Onni Hallsten (1858–1937), Finnish teacher, civil servant, and politician

Finnish-language surnames